Igor Baček (born January 30, 1986) is a Slovak professional ice hockey player who currently plays for the Hannover Indians of the German Oberliga. He previously played in the Slovak Extraliga with HC Slovan Bratislava, HC '05 Banská Bystrica and MHC Martin, and after moving to Germany in 2010 featured in short spells for seven other clubs before settling at the Indians in 2017.

References

External links

1986 births
Living people
EHF Passau Black Hawks players
EV Landsberg players
Hannover Indians players
Hannover Scorpions players
HC '05 Banská Bystrica players
HC Slovan Bratislava players
HK Trnava players
MHC Martin players
Rostock Piranhas players
Saale Bulls Halle players
Slovak ice hockey left wingers
Tri-City Americans players
Ice hockey people from Bratislava
Slovak expatriate ice hockey players in Germany
Slovak expatriate ice hockey players in the United States
Naturalized citizens of Germany